The 2012–13 season was Futbol Club Barcelona's 113th in existence and the club's 82nd consecutive season in the top flight of Spanish football. The season marked the managerial debut of Tito Vilanova, who served as Pep Guardiola's longtime assistant. Vilanova assumed management of the club after Guardiola, who had managed Barcelona for the prior four seasons, declined to renew his contract.

Barcelona finished first in La Liga but lost in the semi-finals of both the Copa del Rey and the UEFA Champions League. The club also set a record (later equaled by Real Madrid) by scoring in all 38 La Liga matches in the season.

Season overview

May/June
On 29 May, Barcelona announced their first pre-season match to be against Hamburger SV in occasion of the German outfit's 125th anniversary celebration. It will be Tito Vilanova's first match in charge of the first team. The second match will be on 28 July in Tangier, Morocco, versus an all-star starting XI from the Moroccan Football League at the Stade de Tanger. This will be their first appearance in Morocco in 38 years.

On 1 June, Barcelona announced Brazilian defender Henrique will not return to team after both agreed to terminate the player's contract on 30 June. Henrique did not make an appearance with the first team and was on-loan in 2008–09 with German club Bayer Leverkusen, 2009–10, and 2010–11 with Racing de Santander and in 2011–12, with Brazilian club Palmeiras.

On 28 June, Barcelona and Valencia CF reached an agreement on the transfer of left back Jordi Alba for €14 million. The player joined the team after UEFA Euro 2012 and signed a five-year deal.

July
On 7 July, Barcelona announced that Seydou Keita would not renew his contract for the upcoming season. The Mali midfielder leaves after four years and 14 titles accumulated while at Barça.

On 10 July, the Royal Spanish Football Federation released the fixture list for the 2012–13 season, with Barcelona opening the season at Camp Nou against Real Sociedad. President Ángel María Villar also confirmed that both Barcelona manager Tito Vilanova and Real Madrid manager José Mourinho will not have to serve their suspensions in the 2012 Supercopa de España for their altercation in last year's edition. Barça's Board Secretary Toni Freixa stated at a press conference that an "aggression can never go unpunished" and "we understand that an aggression on a coach deserves punishment. This measure doesn't make the aggressor innocent but it allows them to believe that they can keep on being aggressive without consequences. It's a bad example for Spanish football that this aggression hasn't been punished."

On 13 July, Barcelona announced that the pre-season match on 28 July would be played against Raja Casablanca instead of Moroccan All-Star XI as previously announced.

On 24 July, Barcelona opened their pre-season with a 2–1 victory over Hamburg at the Imtech Arena. Goals scored by Dani Alves and Gerard Deulofeu to set off a victorious debut for Vilanova. Defender Marc Muniesa left the match with a torn ACL in his right knee in the 52nd minute that could possibly see him miss the rest of the season. The next day, Barcelona doctors confirmed that Muniesa will miss up to six months due to the injury picked up the day before.

On 27 July, Barcelona informed the Catalan Football Federation that Barcelona B, instead of the first team, will dispute the Supercopa de Catalunya against Espanyol set for 31 July at the Olímpic Lluís Companys.

On 28 July, Barcelona defeated Raja Casablanca 8–0 in Tangier with Lionel Messi supplying a hat-trick while Alexis Sánchez added another two goals while Dani Alves, Sergi Gómez, and Deulofeu scored one each.

On 30 July, Barcelona announced they accepted the rescheduled date of the Supercopa de Catalunya after the Catalan Football Association proposed the match to be played on 26 September 2012. They also stated that they would play the strongest team possible as chosen by the manager.

August
On 4 August, Barcelona defeated Paris Saint-Germain 4–1 in penalty shoot-out after a 2–2 draw in regular time for the Trophée de Paris in Paris. Rafinha and Lionel Messi scored the two goals which was kicked off by Eric Abidal, who took the ceremonial kick off.

On 8 August, Barcelona defeated Manchester United 2–0 in a best-of-three penalty shoot-out after a 0–0 draw after regular time. Víctor Valdés saved a Wayne Rooney penalty in the first half of stoppage time, while Jordi Alba made his debut for Barcelona in the second half of the match.

On 11 August, Barcelona defeated Dinamo București 2–0 with goals by Lionel Messi and Ibrahim Afellay. The two long-time injured Barça players, David Villa (fractured tibia) and Andreu Fontàs (torn ACL), made their returns.

On 18 August, Barcelona and English club Arsenal reached an agreement on the transfer of Cameroon midfielder Alex Song for €19 million. The player signed a five-year deal with an €80 million release clause.

On 19 August, Barcelona started their 2012–13 La Liga season with 5–1 home win over Real Sociedad with two goals by Lionel Messi and one each by Carles Puyol, Pedro and David Villa. It also marked a successful debut for Tito Vilanova's first league match as manager.

On 20 August, Barcelona suffered their first defeat of the season at the hands of Sampdoria for the Joan Gamper Trophy by a score of 1–0. Sergi Roberto was named the best player of the match.

On 23 August, Barcelona defeated Real Madrid in the first leg of the Supercopa de España, 3–2, with goals by Pedro, Lionel Messi and Xavi. It was Vilanova's first game and win in a Clásico as manager. Messi's 14th Clásico goal allowed him to equal César Rodríguez's record for Barcelona and marked the first time a player scored in four consecutive Spanish Super Cup matches.

On 26 August, Barcelona came back from a 1–0 half-time deficit to defeat CA Osasuna in El Sadar with a 2–1 victory behind two goals from Lionel Messi in the last 15 minutes of the match. Carles Puyol finished with a broken cheekbone after a collision with Osasuna's forward Roland Lamah towards the end of the match, that also saw manager Vilanova ejected for the first time by referee Muñiz Fernández for excessive argument over a play the Barça manager deemed a foul not called in favour of his team.

On 29 August, the RFEF Competition Committee suspended manager Tito Vilanova after he was ejected in the Osasuna match for what the referee deemed as "angrily protesting a play of the match, after he had been warned by the assistant referee." Barça are set to appeal the suspension. Later that day, Barça were defeated in the second leg of the Supercopa de España 2–1 at the Santiago Bernabéu and lost the tie on away goals. Real Madrid jumped out to a 2–0 lead within the first 20 minutes and the comeback was made even tougher for Barça after the sending off of Adriano in the 28th minute. Lionel Messi scored his sixth goal of the season off a free-kick and has scored in all four competitive matches to start the season for Barcelona. Alex Song made his debut for Barcelona with a perfect passing statistic.

On 30 August, UEFA conducted the group stage draw for the 2012–13 UEFA Champions League in Monaco. Barcelona were drawn into Group G along with Portuguese club Benfica, Spartak Moscow from Russia, and Scottish champions Celtic. Barcelona midfielder Andrés Iniesta received the 2011–12 UEFA Best Player in Europe Award, beating out teammate Lionel Messi and Real Madrid forward Cristiano Ronaldo for the prize.

On 31 August, Barcelona and Schalke 04 agreed on a loan of Ibrahim Afellay to the German club until 30 June 2013.

September
On 2 September, Barcelona defeated Valencia 1–0 at the Camp Nou to start the league season unbeaten before the FIFA international break. Adriano scored the lone goal in the 23rd minute.

On 12 September, Barcelona announced that midfielder Andrés Iniesta would be out 10–15 days with a pulled abductor in his right leg which he picked up during the Georgia–Spain match the day before.

On 15 September, Barcelona defeated Getafe CF with a scoreline of 4–1 at the Coliseum Alfonso Pérez. Lionel Messi started his first match in over a year on the bench but came-on in the 59th minute to score two goals. David Villa added another one as he recovers to full match fitness from his fractured leg from December 2011. Not all was celebrations for Barça, however, as their captain, Carles Puyol, suffered a strained to the posterior cruciate ligament in his left leg in the 53rd minute. The player is expected to miss four-to-six weeks due to the knee injury.

On 19 September, Barcelona made their Champions League debut for the season with a 3–2 home victory over Spartak Moscow. Cristian Tello contributed the opening goal and Lionel Messi the two winning goals, while Dani Alves scored an own goal for the visitors. Early in the first half, Barça's CB Gerard Piqué suffered a sprained left foot and will be out for two to three weeks.

On 22 September, Barcelona defeated Granada at home 2–0 behind a goal from Xavi late in the 87th minute and an own goal in stoppage time to seal the victory.

On 28 September, Lionel Messi won his third consecutive Onze d'Or presented by the French magazine Onze Mondial. With 47.45% of the votes, Messi beat out Cristiano Ronaldo and Atlético Madrid forward Radamel Falcao for the trophy.

On 29 September, Barcelona came from two goals down to claim a 3–2 victory over Sevilla at the Ramón Sánchez Pizjuán Stadium. After Sevilla took a 2–0 lead, two goals by Cesc Fàbregas and one by substitute David Villa in injury time kept Barça on their perfect start to the league season. In the same match, Thiago picked up a knee injury that will sideline him for up to eight weeks.

October
On 2 October, Barcelona defeated Benfica at the Estádio da Luz with 2–0 scoreline to stay unbeaten at the top of the group. Alexis Sánchez and Cesc Fàbregas contributed the winning goals, while Sergio Busquets was sent off in the 89th minute. Late in the second half of the game, Carles Puyol suffered yet another injury when he landed awkwardly and dislocated his left elbow. He is expected to be out for eight weeks.

On 7 October, Barcelona drew their first game of the season with a 2–2 at home against Real Madrid. Both goals came from Lionel Messi, bringing him just one goal short of the all time Clásico scoring record of 18 goals by Alfredo Di Stéfano. Early in the match, Dani Alves picked up a hamstring injury in his left leg and will be out for three weeks.

On 15 October, Barcelona announced defender Andreu Fontàs would be loan out to Mallorca until the end of the season.

On 20 October, Barcelona took a wild match in A Coruña, beating Deportivo de La Coruña 5–4 at the Estadio Riazor. A hat-trick by Lionel Messi gave the visitors all the hard earned three points in where they raced out to a three-goal lead within the first 20 minutes of the match.

On 23 October, Barcelona defeated Celtic 2–1 at home. A goal by Andrés Iniesta at the end of the first half and a Jordi Alba goal in the closing seconds helped Barcelona to take away the win in Xavi's 150th international game with Barcelona.

On 27 October, Barcelona defeated Rayo Vallecano with a dominating scoreline of 5–0 in Vallecas. Leo Messi scored a brace, while David Villa, Xavi and Cesc Fàbregas contributed with a goal each. This win equalled Barcelona's best start in the La Liga.

On 30 October, Barcelona started their Copa del Rey defence with a victory in Vitoria-Gasteiz over Alavés in the first leg with a 3–0 win. Goals from David Villa, Andrés Iniesta and Cesc Fàbregas gave Barça the victory.

November
On 3 November, Barcelona defeated Celta de Vigo 3–1 at home. With goals by Adriano, David Villa and Jordi Alba, Barça confirmed their best start in La Liga in club history. Adriano had to leave the game early with a muscle tear in his right thigh and will be out of action for three weeks.
The win opened a three-point gap at the top of the league over Atlético Madrid.

On 7 November, Barcelona suffered their first Champions League loss of the season with a 2–1 loss in Glasgow against Celtic. The lone goal by Lionel Messi came in the closing minutes of the game. This loss marked Barça's first away defeat in the Champions League Group Stage since 2006.

On 11 November, Barcelona defeated Mallorca 4–2 at the Iberostar. Goals by Xavi, Cristian Tello and a brace by Lionel Messi helped equalizing the best ever La Liga start after the first 11 games of the season, previously archived by Real Madrid 1968–69 and 1991–92. With 76 goals to his name in 2012, Messi also overtook Pelé's record of 75 goals in a single calendar year from 1958 and is only nine goals from drawing with the all-time record from 1972 by Gerd Müller.

On 16 November, Barcelona announced that Qatar Airways will be the new shirt sponsor starting the 2013–14 season, marking the first official commercial sponsor on the Barcelona shirt in team's history. President Sandro Rosell stated "(Qatar Airways) an ambitious brand with global aspirations, always committed to achieving the utmost excellence in its field. These are objectives with which FC Barcelona fully identifies."

On 17 November, Barcelona defeated Zaragoza with 3–1 at home with another brace by Lionel Messi and Alex Song's first goal for Barça.

On 18 November, Marc Bartra pulled the adductor in his right leg during a training session and will be sidelined for 15–20 days.

On 20 November, Barcelona defeated Spartak Moscow at the Luzhniki Stadium 3–0. One goal by Dani Alves and two by Lionel Messi helped Barça to qualify for the knockout phase of the Champions League with one game left to play.

On 25 November, Barcelona defeated Levante in the Ciutat de València 4–0. A brace by Lionel Messi and one goal each by Cesc Fàbregas and Andrés Iniesta, the latter also contributing three assists, as well as a penalty save by Víctor Valdés kept Barça on top of La Liga. For over 60 minutes Barcelona played with only La Masia graduates, after Dani Alves came off injured after 13 minutes.

On 28 November, Barcelona defeated Alavés with 3–1 at home. One goal by Adriano and two by David Villa helped Barça to advance to the Round of 16 of the Copa del Rey, where they will face Córdoba. With the brace, David Villa passed the 300 career goals mark to 301 goals as a professional, including club and country, Spain.

On 29 November, FIFA announced the three finalists for the 2012 FIFA Ballon d'Or to be presented on 7 January 2013: Lionel Messi and Andrés Iniesta from Barcelona and Cristiano Ronaldo from Real Madrid. This marks the third season in a row that at least two finalist are from Barcelona and the six year in a row that Messi makes the final three.

December
On 1 December, Barcelona defeated Athletic Bilbao 5–1 at home with two goals by Lionel Messi and one each by Gerard Piqué, Adriano, and Cesc Fàbregas. With this win Barça set up the best ever start of any team in La Liga. Messi's two goals made him equalize with César Rodríguez as Barcelona's top scorers in La Liga with 190 goals.

On 5 December, Barcelona played their first goalless game of the season, drawing 0–0 against Benfica at home. Shortly after coming on, Lionel Messi had to be carried off on a stretcher after twisting his knee. It was later revealed that Messi picked up a contusion on the outside of his left knee.

On 9 December, Barcelona defeated Real Betis in the Benito Villamarín 2–1. With two more goals by Lionel Messi, Barça continued their undefeated run in away games to start La Liga season to eight matches. Those goals also sent Messi's tally to 86 in 2012, overtaking German striker Gerd Müller's record of 85 goals in a calendar year in 1972. Early in the game, Cesc Fàbregas was subbed off with a torn biceps femoris in his left thigh and will be sidelined for three-to-four weeks.

On 12 December, Barcelona defeated Córdoba at the Nuevo Arcángel 2–0. Both goals were scored by Lionel Messi in his first Copa del Rey game of the season.

On 16 December, Barcelona defeated Atlético Madrid at home 4–1. Two goals by Lionel Messi and one each by Adriano and Sergio Busquets. This victory helped Barça to draw nine points clear at the top of the table, and Messi's goals brought his record up to 90 for the year.

On 17 December, Cristian Tello extended his contract with Barcelona until 30 June 2016, with a set buyout clause of €10 million.

On 18 December, Barcelona announced the renewal of contracts with Carles Puyol and Xavi until 2016 and Lionel Messi until 2018.

On 19 December, Barcelona's Medical Services announced that manager Tito Vilanova was to undergo surgery on the following day after a routine check-up revealed that he suffered a parotid ailment relapse, which he was operated on a year previous. During the recovery time, assistant coach Jordi Roura will lead Barça.

On 20 December, UEFA conducted the Round of 16 draw for the 2012–13 UEFA Champions League in Nyon. Barcelona were drawn to face Italian club Milan, who they last faced in the previous season's quarter-finals.

On 22 December, Barcelona won their last match of the year at the José Zorrilla against Real Valladolid with a score of 3–1. Goals by Xavi, Lionel Messi and Cristian Tello helped to keep the nine point lead on top of the table intact.

On 23 December, Barcelona announced that backup goalkeeper José Manuel Pinto came to an agreement with the club to extend his contract for another year until 30 June 2014.

January
On 6 January, Barcelona won their first match of the year at home, against Espanyol 4–0. Two goals by Pedro and one each by Xavi and Lionel Messi were scored in the first 30 minutes of the game.

On 7 January, Lionel Messi was announced the 2012 FIFA Ballon d'Or winner in Zürich. With 41.60% of the votes, Messi became the first player to win the award on four occasions, surpassing Johan Cruyff, Michel Platini and Marco van Basten, all with three. The win also gave Barcelona its tenth winner, the most all time of any European club. Barcelona also celebrated five players in the 2012 FIFA FIFPro World XI, as Messi was joined by teammates Gerard Piqué, Dani Alves, Andrés Iniesta and Xavi as the world's best for 2012.

On 10 January, Barcelona beat Córdoba in the return leg of the Copa del Rey at home by 5–0, with one goal scored by Thiago and two each by David Villa and Alexis Sánchez. With an aggregate score of 7–0, Barça went through to the quarter-finals, where they will face Málaga. Early in the second half of the game, Sergi Roberto was subbed off with a tear in his left hamstring and will be out of action for four weeks.

On 13 January, Barcelona beat Málaga at the La Rosaleda Stadium 3–1, with goals by Lionel Messi, Cesc Fàbregas and Thiago. With this win, Barça ended the first round of the season with a record-breaking 55 out of a possible 57 points.

On 16 January, Barcelona drew 2–2 against Málaga at home in the first leg of the Copa del Rey quarter-finals. Goals by Lionel Messi and Carles Puyol were scored within one minute of each other.

On 18 January, Barcelona announced that goalkeeper Víctor Valdés will not be extending his contract any further after his current contract expires on 30 June 2014.

On 19 January, Barcelona lost their first league game away against Real Sociedad at the Anoeta Stadium, 3–2. After leading by two goals from Messi and Pedro, Gerard Piqué was sent off with a second yellow and Sociedad turned the game around and scored the winning goal in the dying minutes.

On 24 January, Barcelona defeated Málaga in the La Rosaleda 4–2, with goals by Pedro, Piqué, Iniesta and Messi. With an aggregate score of 6–4, Barça went through to the Copa del Rey semi-finals, where they will face Real Madrid.

On 27 January, Barcelona defeated Osasuna at home 5–1 with four goals by Messi and one from Pedro. With those goals, Messi broke the 200-goal barrier in La Liga, becoming the youngest player to archive that feat at just 25 years and 217 days of age.

On 30 January, Barcelona drew 1–1 against Real Madrid in the Santiago Bernabéu in the first leg of the Copa del Rey semi-finals. The lone Barça goal was scored by Cesc Fàbregas.

On 31 January, Barcelona and Ajax agreed on the loan of forward Isaac Cuenca to the Dutch club until 30 June 2013. On the same day, Barça announced that defender Marc Muniesa will join the B team for the rest of the season after having recovered from a torn ACL.

February
On 3 February, Barcelona drew their second league match of the season and their second season match in a row. A 1–1 draw against Valencia at the Mestalla Stadium saw Messi scoring the only goal through a penalty. Xavi, who was substituted in injury time of the match, was diagnosed the following day with a hamstring injury and will be sidelined for 15 days. Barcelona faced Milan in the first leg of the Champions League round of 16 at the San Siro and lost 2–0, with goals coming from Kevin-Prince Boateng and Sulley Muntari.

On 21 February, Barcelona announced that defender Eric Abidal is fit to play for the first time since receiving a liver transplant in April 2012. On 24 February, Barcelona defeated Sevilla 2–1 at Camp Nou with goals from David Villa and Lionel Messi. On 26 February, Barcelona were defeated by Real Madrid 3–1, 4–2 on aggregate, at the Camp Nou and were knocked out of Copa del Rey contention.

March
On 2 March, Barcelona lost to Real Madrid at the Santiago Bernabéu by a score of 2–1. This was Barcelona's second loss against Real Madrid in a week. Four days later, Víctor Valdés was handed a four-match league ban after receiving a double yellow card for verbally abusing a referee following his team's defeat in the Clásico in the weekend fixture.

On 9 March, Barcelona defeated Deportivo de La Coruña 2–0 with goals from Alexis Sánchez and Lionel Messi. On 12 March, Barcelona defeated Milan 4–0, 4–2 on aggregate, and entered the quarter-finals of the Champions League with goals from David Villa, Jordi Alba and a brace from Lionel Messi. On 17 March, Barcelona defeated Rayo Vallecano 3–1 at Camp Nou with Messi scoring two and Villa scoring one goal. On 30 March, Barça drew 2–2 with Celta de Vigo with Messi and Cristian Tello scoring one goal each.

April
On 2 April, Barça drew 2–2 against Paris Saint-Germain in France in the first leg of the Champions League quarter-final, the goals coming from Messi and Xavi via a penalty.

On 10 April, Barça drew 1–1 against PSG at home in the Camp Nou in the Champions League quarter-final second leg. Pedro scored the all-important equaliser, which put Barça through to the semi-finals on the away goals rule. The draw for the semi-finals of the Champions League was held on 12 April, with Barça drawing with Bayern Munich.

On 14 April, Barcelona defeated Zarozoga 3–0 away from home.
 A 1–0 win over Levante on 20 April means that Barcelona need a maximum of six more points to secure the 2012–13 La Liga title.

On 23 April, Barcelona lost to Bayern 4–0 away at the Allianz Arena in Munich, their largest defeat in Europe in 16 years. On 1 May, in the second leg at home, they lost 3–0. With an aggregate score of 7–0, they were knocked out of the Champions League in the semi-finals.

May
On 5 May, Barcelona defeated Real Betis 4–2 at home with two goals by Lionel Messi and one each by David Villa and Alexis Sánchez with one more win to secure the La Liga title.

On 11 May, Barcelona clinched their 22nd La Liga title after Real Madrid's draw against Espanyol at the Cornellà-El Prat. The result gave Barcelona an eight-point lead with two matches remaining, which ensured that they would finish top of the table. Barcelona were at the top of the league table for the entirety of the season, and only lost two matches en route to winning the title. It was the first title for manager Vilanova.

On 30 May, French defender Eric Abidal called a press conference to announce his departure from the club after six seasons. Although admitting he wanted to see out his career as a Barça player, the club ultimately decided not to renew his contract.

Players

Squad information

From the youth system

Transfers in

Total spending:  €33 million

Transfers out

Total income:  €0

Expenditure:  €33 million

Club

Current technical staff

Statistics

Player statistics

Note: The Time Played is not updated yet.

Goal scorers

Last updated: 26 May 2013

Disciplinary record
Includes all competitive matches. Players listed below made at least one appearance for Barcelona first squad during the season.

Fair Play award
This award is given annually since 1999 to the team with the best fair play during the season. This ranking takes into account aspects such as cards, suspension of matches, audience behaviour and other penalties. This section not only aims to determine the best fair play, but also serves to break the tie in teams that are tied in all the other rules: points, head-to-head, goal difference and goals scored.

Source: La Liga Fair Play Award Standings
Last updated: 9 May 2013

Pre-season and friendlies

Competitions

Overall

Supercopa de España

La Liga

League table

Results summary

Results by round

Matches

Copa del Rey

Kickoff times are in CET.

Round of 32

Round of 16

Quarter-finals

Semi-finals

UEFA Champions League

Group stage

Knockout phase

Round of 16

Quarter-finals

Semi-finals

Copa Catalunya

References 

Spanish football clubs 2012–13 season
2012–13 UEFA Champions League participants seasons
2012–13
2012–13 in Catalan football
2012–13